Photopectoralis is a genus of marine ray-finned fishes, ponyfish from the family Leiognathidae. They are native to the Indian Ocean and the western Pacific Ocean.

Species
There are four recognized species in this genus:
 Photopectoralis aureus (T. Abe & Haneda, 1972) (Golden ponyfish)
 Photopectoralis bindus (Valenciennes, 1835) (Orangefin ponyfish)
 Photopectoralis hataii (T. Abe & Haneda, 1972) (Hatai's ponyfish)
 Photopectoralis panayensis (Seishi Kimura & Dunlap, 2003) (Panay ponyfish)

References

Leiognathidae
Bioluminescent fish